Nelly Bell Knutsen (27 April 1905 – 23 October 1991) was a Norwegian politician for the Christian Democratic Party.

She served as a deputy representative to the Norwegian Parliament from Hordaland during the term 1961–1965.

References

1905 births
1991 deaths
Christian Democratic Party (Norway) politicians
Deputy members of the Storting